ROWE Racing is the motor racing team of the German lubricant manufacturer ROWE Mineralölwerk GmbH. Since 2011 ROWE Racing has competed in series such as the VLN (Association of Nürburgring Endurance Cup Organizers), the GT World Challenge Europe (former Blancpain GT Series), the Deutsche Tourenwagen Masters and the 24 Hours Nürburgring. In 2020 it won both the Nürburgring 24 Hours and the Spa 24 Hours.

Team
The team was founded in 2011 by Michael Zehe and Hans-Peter Naundorf. The operations of the racing team are made by Motorsport Competence Group AG (MCG AG) who is a development partner and service provider for the automotive and racing area.

Under the name Team ROWE Motorsport the team entered the VLN championship in 2009. Team co-owner Michael Zehe ran an Audi TT with Franz Rohr. In 2010 Michael Zehe, Marco Schelp and Alexander Roloff ran the Porsche 911 GT3 Cup S during the season with occasional support from Mark Bullitt. Bullitt was a racing driver living in Germany but racing under an American licence. The team achieved a number of top ten overall finishes.

Mercedes-Benz years

Late 2010 Naundorf was contacted by ROWE Mineralölwerk GmbH CEO Michael Toe about entering a Mercedes-Benz SLS AMG GT3 in GT races. Naundorf worked with Florian Rhotert to enter ROWE Racing in the VLN, a championship solely racing at the Nürburgring Nordschleife. The team entered three cars (one co-entered with Christian Mamerow) in the first race of the season, the 58th ADAC Westfalenfahrt. In the GT3 class the team entered two SLS AMG GT3 cars and one Porsche 911 GT3 Cup S. Only one SLS AMG GT3 took the start, which subsequently failed to finish. The Porsche finished the race in seventeenth place with drivers Michael Zehe, Alexander Roloff and Marco Schelp. After the first race the team decided to no longer enter the Porsche and focusing on entering three Mercedes-Benz sportscars. In the second round of the season the co-entered Mamerow/ROWE Racing Mercedes-Benz SLS AMG GT3 won the race with Mamerow and Armin Hahne driving. The team with Zehe, Roloff and Roland Rehfeld won their second race near the end of the season during the 34th RCM DMV Grenzlandrennen The teams best placed car in the 2011 24 Hours of Nürburgring finished seventeenth, the other two cars failed to finish.

Jan Seyffarth joined the team in VLN in 2012. Seyffarth and Roloff won the 52nd ADAC Reinoldus-Langstreckenrennen with only a tiny margin of 0.338 seconds. When Thomas Jäger joined the team for the 6 hour ADAC Ruhr-Pokal-Rennen the team scored their second victory. The 2013 24 Hours of Nürburgring was very successful for the German team. ROWE Racing finished third and fourth. For the 2013 season Seyffarth ran the VLN races with various teammates. With Seyffarth, Lance David Arnold and Nico Bastian the team won the OPEL 6-Stunden ADAC Ruhr-Pokal-Rennen. The team won the race again the following year with Jäger and Serffarth. A new driver pairing of Christian Hohenadel and Maro Engel won the ROWE sponsored DMV 250-Meilen-Rennen in 2014 Renger van der Zande joined Engel and Seyffarth for the openingsrace of the VLN series. The race was cut short after a heavy crash by Jann Mardenborough in the GT Academy Nissan GT-R Nismo in which one spectator was killed. ROWE Racing was in the lead when the race was red flagged. Hohenadel and Klaus Graf scored the second season victory for the team at the 38th RCM DMV Grenzlandrennen In 2015 the team also ran one round of the ADAC GT Masters series. Stef Dusseldorp and Nico Bastian represented the team at the Nürburgring finishing eleventh in race one and thirteenth in race two.

ROWE Racing first entered the Blancpain Endurance Series in 2015. The teams best finish was a fourth place at the 1000km Paul Ricard. At the prestigious 24 Hours of Spa the team (with Daniel Juncadella, Nico Bastian and Stef Dusseldorp) was in the lead at the 6 hour and 12 hour marks, scoring valuable points for the championship. A problem on the alternator caused the team to retire with less than sixty minutes to go.

BMW Motorsport factory team
Starting in 2016 the team received factory support by BMW Motorsport. The team entered two BMW F13 M6 GT3 cars in the Blancpain Endurance Series and Sprint Cup. After a fourth place at Silverstone the team picked up its first Blancpain Endurance Series win at the prestigious 24 Hours of Spa. In 2020 it won both the Nürburgring 24 Hours and the Spa 24 Hours. 

The team participated in the 2021 Deutsche Tourenwagen Masters by fielding two BMW M6 GT3 cars full-time. The cars were driven by BMW factory drivers Timo Glock and Sheldon van der Linde, with the latter scoring the team's best result of the season by finishing in fourth place on one occasion. On 15 February 2022, the team announced that it would not return to the series in 2022 and instead use the new BMW M4 GT3 cars for endurance racing.

Timeline

Competition Vehicles
ROWE Racing competed with up to four Mercedes-Benz SLS AMG GT3 until 2016.
The team ran the BMW M6 GT3 from 2016 till 2021. Since 2022 it runs the BMW M4 GT3.

Results

Deutsche Tourenwagen Masters

Complete 24 Hours of Nürburgring results
(key) (Races in bold indicate pole position) (Races in italics indicate fastest lap)

Complete Blancpain Endurance Series results
(key) (Races in bold indicate pole position) (Races in italics indicate fastest lap)

References

External links
 
 Website of ROWE MINERALÖLWERK GMBH
 Website of MCG AG

German auto racing teams
2011 establishments in Germany
ADAC GT Masters teams
Blancpain Endurance Series teams
Deutsche Tourenwagen Masters teams
International GT Open teams
BMW in motorsport
Porsche in motorsport
Auto racing teams established in 2011